The Northern Michigan Predators were a semi-professional ice hockey team that played for one season in the International Independent Hockey League. The IIHL survived less than one month.

History 
The first-ever league game was contested on December 7, 2003 when the Predators hosted the Lansing Ice Nuts. Lansing won the game 3-2. The final game in league history was played on January 4, 2004 when the Predators defeated Lansing 5-2.

Of the original six IIHL teams, Northern Michigan played eight league games going 4-4 against Lansing and the Soo City Mavericks.

Team personnel 
G.M. Joseph Kolodziej
Head Coach Craig Coxe
Asst. Coach Rhett Dudley
Captain Mike Wolf
Asst. Captain Jacek Wilk
Asst. Captain Frank Alfaro

References

Defunct ice hockey teams in the United States
Ice hockey teams in Michigan